The Kerrang! Awards 2012 were held in London, England, on 7 June 2012 at The Brewery in East London and were hosted by Slipknot singer Corey Taylor and Anthrax guitarist Scott Ian.

On 2 May 2012, Kerrang! announced the 2012 nominees. The main categories were dominated by You Me at Six with five nominations, followed by Black Veil Brides and Falling in Reverse with three apiece.

The Kerrang! Awards 2012 incorporated new categories, including awards for films, video games, comedians, the hero and villain of the year.

Winners and nominees

Best British Newcomer
While She Sleeps
Yashin
Fearless Vampire Killers
Don Broco
Hawk Eyes

Best International Newcomer
Motionless In White
Tonight Alive
Falling in Reverse
Of Mice & MenReckless Love

Best British BandYou Me at SixBullet for My Valentine
Asking Alexandria
Lostprophets
Iron Maiden

Best International Band
Thirty Seconds to MarsMy Chemical RomanceEvanescence
A Day to Remember
letlive.

Best Live Band
You Me at Six
Black Veil Brides
Asking AlexandriaEnter ShikariMy Chemical Romance

Best Album
Black Veil Brides — Set the World on Fire
You Me at Six — Sinners Never Sleep
Enter Shikari — A Flash Flood of Colour
Young Guns — BonesMastodon — The HunterBest Single
You Me at Six (featuring Oli Sykes) — "Bite My Tongue"
You Me at Six — "No One Does it Better"
Young Guns — "Bones"Black Veil Brides — "Rebel Love Song"Falling in Reverse — "The Drug in Me Is You"

Best Video
Falling in Reverse — "The Drug in Me Is You"
Mastodon — "Curl of the Burl"
Motionless in White — "Immaculate Misconception"
Paramore — "Monster"Bring Me the Horizon — "Alligator Blood"Best TV Show
The Big Bang Theory
The Walking DeadGame of ThronesAmerican Horror Story
Misfits

Best Video GameThe Elder Scrolls V: SkyrimFIFA 12
Mass Effect 3
Gears of War 3
Call of Duty: Modern Warfare 3

Best FilmThe Hunger GamesThe Woman in Black
The Inbetweeners Movie
The Muppets
The Girl with the Dragon Tattoo

Best Comedian
Greg DaviesRussell HowardTim Minchin
Noel Fielding
Bill Bailey

Tweeter of the Year
Danny Worsnop, Asking Alexandria
Jono Yates, Blitz Kids
Sean Smith, The BlackoutHayley Williams, ParamoreMark Hoppus, Blink-182

Hottest Female
Hayley Williams, Paramore
Tay Jardine, We Are The In Crowd
Amy Lee, EvanescenceLzzy Hale, HalestormJenna McDougall, Tonight Alive

Hottest Male
Andy Biersack, Black Veil BridesBen Bruce, Asking AlexandriaAshley Purdy, Black Veil Brides
Alex Gaskarth, All Time Low
Matthew Bellamy, Muse
Christian Coma, Black Veil Brides

Villain of the YearJustin BieberSimon Cowell
Ronnie Radke, Falling in Reverse
Lou Reed
One Direction

Hero of the Year
Ronnie Radke, Falling in Reverse
M. Shadows, Avenged Sevenfold
Jared Leto, Thirty Seconds to Mars
Mario Balotelli, Manchester City F.C.Rou Reynolds, Enter ShikariBest FestivalDownload FestivalHevy Music Festival
Reading and Leeds Festivals
Slam Dunk Festival
Hit the Deck Festival

Kerrang! Service to RockTenacious DDevotion AwardThe BlackoutKerrang! Service to MetalDownload FestivalKerrang! Hall of FameMachine HeadKerrang! IconSlashKerrang! InspirationBlack Sabbath'''

Performances

5 June

6 June

References

External links
Kerrang! Awards official website

2012
2012 music awards
2012 in London
Culture in London
2012 in British music
Music in London